Edward Wass (born October 27, 1952) is an American television director and former actor. He is best known for his roles as Danny Dallas on the series Soap (1977–1981) and as Nick Russo on the NBC sitcom Blossom (1991–1995). After Blossom ended its run in 1995, Wass retired from acting and focused only on directing episodic television series, such as Spin City, The Big Bang Theory, Less than Perfect and 2 Broke Girls.  Wass returned to acting when he reunited with Mayim Bialik and played her father again on Bialik's Call Me Kat in 2022.

Early life and education
Wass was born in Lakewood, Ohio (just west of Cleveland). He attended Goodman School of Drama at the Art Institute of Chicago (now at DePaul University).

Wass trained as an opera singer and was also involved in rock and roll as a lead singer and guitarist.

Career

Acting
In 1976, Wass made his Broadway debut in the original Broadway production of Grease, playing Danny Zuko.

He made his television debut as Danny Dallas on Soap opposite stage veteran Katherine Helmond from 1977 to 1981, filming 101 episodes. He appeared on Broadway with his Soap co-star Diana Canova in Neil Simon's They're Playing Our Song.

Wass starred in Curse of the Pink Panther (1983), one of the post-Peter Sellers films in the franchise, as Detective Sergeant Clifton Sleigh, engaged by Police Chief Dreyfus to track down Inspector Clouseau.

He played struggling musician Bobby Shelton (who trades his soul — and his family — to become an ill-fated rock star "Billy Wayne") in the black comedy film Oh, God! You Devil (1984). He played a sports journalist caught up in a murder in female-Tarzan film Sheena (1984), which received five nominations in the Razzie Awards.

In 1986, he starred in the TV movie Triplecross, directed by David Greene, in which he, Markie Post, and Gary Swanson are cops who receive a huge sum of money from a kidnap victim and become private detectives, competing against each other to solve cases. This was intended as a pilot but the series was never picked up.

His last acting role was among his most prominent, playing the title character's father in Blossom (1991–1995), a sitcom about a teenage girl with two brothers being brought up by their single father.

Directing
Wass began directing while acting on the TV sitcom Blossom. He has directed episodes of over 40 TV series along with many TV movies.

Personal life
Wass' first wife was actress Janet Margolin, who died in December 1993 at age 50 from ovarian cancer. Their two children are Julian (a composer) and Matilda. He has two grandchildren from Julian's marriage to director Jenee Lamarque. His second wife is producer Nina Wass, whom he married in 1996. Together they have a daughter named Stella.

Actor filmography

Director filmography

References

External links
 
 

1952 births
Living people
20th-century American male actors
Male actors from Illinois
Male actors from Ohio
American male film actors
American male television actors
American television directors
DePaul University alumni
People from Glen Ellyn, Illinois
People from Lakewood, Ohio
American people of Hungarian descent